Trail of Hope: The Anders Army, An Odyssey across Three Continents  is a history book about the World War II-era Polish Anders Army, written by the English historian Norman Davies. It was published by Osprey Publishing in 2015. The book was published in English and Polish same year.

References

External links 

 Trail of Hope at Osprey Publishing

21st-century history books
Books by Norman Davies
English-language books
2015 non-fiction books
History books about Poland
Books about World War II